The list of ship launches in 1662 includes a chronological list of some ships launched in 1662.

References 

Lists of ship launches
1662 in transport
1660s ships